Toni Elling (born Rosita Sims, c. 1929), also known by her stage name Satin Doll, is an American burlesque dancer.

Elling was born in Detroit to Joseph and Myrtle Sims, the eldest of three children. She was unhappy with her job as a telephone operator at the Michigan Bell Telephone Company where she had worked for 9 years, because she could not get promoted because she was an African American. She got into burlesque dancing in 1960 when she was 32 years old after a friend suggested she get into stripping, and continued performing until the early 1970s. She married but she soon divorced, as her husband was abusive. They had no children. She took her name from her friend and confidant, bandleader Duke Ellington. She was also friends with Sammy Davis Jr. and fighter Joe Louis. She would never take off her panties in her act or wear a G-string because it is “entertainment, yes, but the idea is to suggest what’s there, not throw off all your clothes and reveal everything. That’s why they call it strip-tease.”

Elling retired in 1974. In 2016 she was inducted into the Burlesque Hall of Fame in Las Vegas.

References

American burlesque performers
People from Detroit
Living people
American female erotic dancers
American erotic dancers
1920s births
Dancers from Michigan
21st-century American women